Hamburg Messe und Congress GmbH (acronym: HMC) is a legal entity owned by the city of Hamburg (full German name: Freie und Hansestadt Hamburg). The Hamburg exhibition complex is host to more than 40 events managed by HMC or third-party organizers annually, drawing over 15,000 exhibitors and 700,000 visitors. In addition, the CCH (Congress Center Hamburg) has hosted approximately 250 conferences, conventions, annual meetings and other events per annum until the end of 2016, attracting an additional 300,000 national and international attendees. The owners of the CCH, CCH Immobilien GmbH & Co. KG, launched a comprehensive remodeling and modernization campaign of the convention center in January, 2017.

Size and situation 
The exhibition complex is in the city center, and covers roughly 950,000 sq ft of exhibition floor in eleven halls as well as 100,000 sq ft of open air space. Both the fair halls and the CCH are located next to the Planten un Blomen city park. The Port of Hamburg, the inner city shopping district and many hotels are all in the immediate vicinity. The CCH – Congress Center Hamburg is a few minutes' walk away from the fair halls. The complex can also be reached via two train stations, Hamburg Airport, three commuter train and subway stations as well as several feeder roads.

Portfolio 
The current portfolio of events held on the site focuses on industries that are well established in the city; such as the international maritime trade fair SMM, the food service trade show INTERNORGA, and the expo for wind energy WindEnergy Hamburg. Other trade shows open to the general public include the tourism fair REISEN HAMBURG and the equestrian expo HansePferd Hamburg, along with special events. Two new events organized by HMC were added in 2017: home², a trade show catering to home builders, and the Hamburg Motor Classics expo for antique and vintage cars. There are also guest events geared towards specific industries, such as the aviation or renewable energy sectors. Hamburg Messe und Congress is also active internationally, hosting its own trade shows abroad as well as organizing German joint booths at major international industry events.

References 

 Ulrich Gaßdorf: CCH mit Asbest verseucht — ab 2017 wird das Gebäude saniert. In: abendblatt.de. 8 October 2014, retrieved 4 January 2016 (de-de).

External links 
 Offizielle Website der Hamburg Messe und Congress

Hamburg
Trade fairs in Germany